Lepajan is a genus of anyphaenid sac spiders first described by Antônio Brescovit in 1993. it contains only two species.

References

Anyphaenidae
Araneomorphae genera
Spiders of Central America
Spiders of South America
Taxa named by Antônio Brescovit